The Last Word (translit. Poslednata duma) is a 1973 Bulgarian drama film directed by Binka Zhelyazkova. It was entered into the 1974 Cannes Film Festival.

Cast
 Iana Guirova - Ana
 Tzvetana Maneva - Uchitelkata
 Aneta Petrovska - Chernata Maria
 Emilia Radeva - Shivachkata
 Leda Taseva - Vera Stoyanova
 Dorotea Toncheva - Studentkata
 Bella Tsoneva - Yana
 Nikolay Binev - Sledovatelyat
 Itzhak Finzi - Sveshtenikat
 Nikola Todev - Strazharyat
 Elena Mirchovska - Uchenichka
 Maria Statoulova - Uchenichka
 Filip Trifonov - Studentat
 Katya Dineva
 Milka Popangelova

References

External links

1973 films
1970s Bulgarian-language films
1973 drama films
Films directed by Binka Zhelyazkova
Bulgarian drama films